Karen Alejandra Vilorio Muchnik (born 27 May 1993) is a Honduran retired swimmer. She competed at the 2012 Summer Olympics. She was born in Tegucigalpa.

References

Honduran female swimmers
1993 births
Living people
Olympic swimmers of Honduras
Swimmers at the 2012 Summer Olympics
Female backstroke swimmers
Swimmers at the 2010 Summer Youth Olympics
Swimmers at the 2015 Pan American Games
Swimmers at the 2011 Pan American Games
Sportspeople from Tegucigalpa
Pan American Games competitors for Honduras
Florida Gulf Coast Eagles women's swimmers